Emphytoecia is a genus of longhorn beetles of the subfamily Lamiinae, containing the following species:

 Emphytoecia alboliturata (Blanchard in Gay, 1851)
 Emphytoecia camousseighti Cerda, 1995
 Emphytoecia dimidiata (Blanchard in Gay, 1851)
 Emphytoecia elquiensis Cerda, 1995
 Emphytoecia lineolata (Blanchard in Gay, 1851)
 Emphytoecia niveopicta Fairmaie & Germain, 1864
 Emphytoecia sutura-alba Fairmaie & Germain, 1859
 Emphytoecia suturella (Blanchard in Gay, 1851)

References

Pteropliini